This is a list of 113 species in Leiodes, a genus of round fungus beetles in the family Leiodidae.

Leiodes species

 Leiodes alesi Baranowski, 1993 i g
 Leiodes alternata Melsheimer, 1844 i g
 Leiodes antennata (Fall, 1910) i g
 Leiodes appalachiana Baranowski, 1993 i g b
 Leiodes assimilis (LeConte, 1850) i g b
 Leiodes assimiloides Baranowski, 1993 i g
 Leiodes austriacus Daffner, 1983 g
 Leiodes autumnalis Baranowski, 1993 i g
 Leiodes badia (Sturm, 1807) g
 Leiodes bicolor (Schmidt, 1841) g
 Leiodes brandisi Holdhaus, 1902 g
 Leiodes brunnea (Sturm, 1807) g
 Leiodes calcarata (Erichson, 1845) g
 Leiodes californica Baranowski, 1993 i g
 Leiodes campbelli Baranowski, 1993 i g
 Leiodes canariensis (Wollaston, 1863) g
 Leiodes carpathicus (Ganglbauer, 1896) g
 Leiodes cascadensis Baranowski, 1993 i g
 Leiodes castanescens (Fairmaire, 1881) g
 Leiodes ciliaris (Schmidt, 1841) g
 Leiodes cinnamomea (Panzer, 1793) g
 Leiodes collaris (LeConte, 1850) i g
 Leiodes conferta (LeConte, 1866) i g
 Leiodes conjuncta Baranowski, 1993 i g
 Leiodes contaminabilis Baranowski, 1993 i g
 Leiodes curvata (Mannerheim, 1853) i g
 Leiodes difficilis (Horn, 1880) i g
 Leiodes dilutipes (Sahlberg, 1903) g
 Leiodes discontignyi (C.Brisout de Barneville, 1867) g
 Leiodes distinguendus (Fairmaire, 1856) g
 Leiodes dubia (Fabricius, 1792) g
 Leiodes ferruginea (Fabricius, 1787) g
 Leiodes flavescens (Schmidt, 1841) g
 Leiodes flavicornis (Brisout de Barneville, 1884) g
 Leiodes fracta (Seidlitz, 1874) g
 Leiodes furva (Erichson, 1845) g
 Leiodes gallica Reitter, 1884 g
 Leiodes ganglbaueri (Holdhaus, 1902) g
 Leiodes graecus Svec, 1993 g
 Leiodes graefi Svec, 1994 g
 Leiodes grandipes Baranowski, 1993 i g
 Leiodes grossa Hatch, 1957 i g
 Leiodes gyllenhalii Stephens, 1829 g
 Leiodes hiemalis (Abeille de Perrin, 1901) g
 Leiodes horni Hatch, 1957 i g b
 Leiodes hybrida (Erichson, 1845) g
 Leiodes impersonata Brown, 1932 i g
 Leiodes impressa Baranowski, 1993 i g
 Leiodes inordinata (J.Sahlberg, 1898) g
 Leiodes interjecta Baranowski, 1993 i g
 Leiodes javorniki (Hlisnikovsky, 1964) g
 Leiodes karinae Baranowski, 1993 i g
 Leiodes klapperichi Daffner, 1983 g
 Leiodes lateritia (Mannerheim, 1852) i g
 Leiodes litura Stephens, 1832 g
 Leiodes longipes (Schmidt, 1841) g
 Leiodes longitarsis Baranowski, 1993 i g
 Leiodes lostine (Hatch, 1957) i g
 Leiodes lucens (Fairmaire, 1855) g
 Leiodes lunicollis (Rye, 1872) g
 Leiodes macropus (Rye, 1873) g
 Leiodes maculicollis (Rye, 1875) g
 Leiodes merkeliana (Horn, 1895) i g
 Leiodes morula (LeConte, 1859) i g
 Leiodes multidentata Baranowski, 1993 i g
 Leiodes neglecta Baranowski, 1993 i g b
 Leiodes nigrita (Schmidt, 1841) g
 Leiodes nitidula (Erichson, 1845) g
 Leiodes nitidus (Reitter, 1884) g
 Leiodes obesa (Schmidt, 1841) g
 Leiodes oblonga (Erichson, 1845) g
 Leiodes obscura (Fairmaire & Coquerel, 1859) g
 Leiodes oceanicus (Wollaston, 1864) g
 Leiodes opacipennis (Fall, 1910) i g
 Leiodes pacifica Baranowski, 1993 i g
 Leiodes pallens (Sturm, 1807) g
 Leiodes paludicola (Crotch, 1874) i g
 Leiodes picea (Panzer, 1797) g
 Leiodes polita (Marsham, 1802) g
 Leiodes puncticollis (Thomson, 1862) i g b
 Leiodes punctostriata Kirby, 1837 i g b
 Leiodes punctulata (Gyllenhal, 1810) i g
 Leiodes pygmaea Baranowski, 1993 i g
 Leiodes quebecensis Baranowski, 1993 i g
 Leiodes rhaetica (Erichson, 1845) i g
 Leiodes rosai Daffner, 1983 g
 Leiodes rotundata (Erichson, 1845) g
 Leiodes rubiginosa (Schmidt, 1841) g
 Leiodes ruficollis (J.Sahlberg, 1898) g
 Leiodes rufipennis (Paykull, 1798) g
 Leiodes rufipes (Gebler, 1833) i g b
 Leiodes rufobasalis Baranowski, 1993 i g
 Leiodes rugosa Stephens, 1829 g
 Leiodes scita Erichson, 1845 g
 Leiodes serripes Hatch, 1936 i g
 Leiodes sierranevadae Baranowski, 1993 i g
 Leiodes silesiaca (Kraatz, 1852) g
 Leiodes similis (Fall, 1910) i g
 Leiodes skalitzkyi (Ganglbauer, 1899) g
 Leiodes soerenssoni Baranowski, 1993 i g
 Leiodes sparreschneideri Strand, 1943 g
 Leiodes sphaerula Baranowski, 1993 i g
 Leiodes stephani Baranowski, 1993 i g
 Leiodes strigata (LeConte, 1850) i g
 Leiodes strigipennis Daffner, 1983 g
 Leiodes subconvexus Daffner, 1983 g
 Leiodes subtilicornis Baranowski, 1993 i g
 Leiodes subtilis (Reitter, 1885) g
 Leiodes tauricus (Breit, 1917) g
 Leiodes triepkei (Schmidt, 1841) i g
 Leiodes valida (Horn, 1880) i g
 Leiodes variipennis Baranowski, 1993 i g
 Leiodes vladimiri (Fleischer, 1906) g

Data sources: i = ITIS, c = Catalogue of Life, g = GBIF, b = Bugguide.net

References